Brinn is both a surname and a given name. Notable people with the name include:

Andrew Brinn (1829–?), Scottish Union Navy officer
Joseph Brinn, American basketball player and coach
Sion Brinn (born 1973), Jamaican-born British swimmer
Brinn Bevan (born 1997), British artistic gymnast